Getting into Death is a collection of science fiction stories by Thomas M. Disch.  It was first published by Rupert Hart-Davis in 1974.  Many of the stories originally appeared in the magazines Transatlantic Review, Fantasy and Science Fiction, Amazing Stories, Fantastic, New Worlds, The Paris Review and Antæus.

Contents

 "Slaves"
 "The Happy Story"
 "The Asian Shore"
 "The Persistence of Desire"
 "Quincunx"
 "Displaying the Flag"
 "The Beginning of April or the End of March"
 "The Planet Arcadia"
 "The Invasion of the Giant Stupid Dinosaurs"
 "A Kiss Goodbye"
 "[X] Yes"
 "Feathers from the Wings of an Angel"
 "Let Us Quickly Hasten to the Gate of Ivory"
 "The Colors"
 "The Master of the Milford Altarpiece"
 The Complete Short Stories
 "The Man Who Understood the Difference Between Salmon and Orange Chiffon"
 "The Extension Cord"
 "Mrs. Gallagher’s Psychoanalysis"
 "The Novelist with Wooden Character"
 "Dawn Breaks Over Crakow"
 "The Tic"
 "What They Do with Mothers-in-Law in Tierra Del Fuego"
 "The Cottonwood Tree"
 "The Golden Lemons"
 "The Page for October Has Been Torn Off"
 "The Romance of the Boy and the Girl"
 "The Man Who Didn’t Doubt It"
 "Gratitude, Or, the Serpent’s Tooth"
 "Happy Families All Like Scrabble"
 "Jessica, Raymond, and Jack"
 "The Pocket from Brooks Brothers"
 "Vapors"
 " A Day in the Life of the Artist"
 "Farewell to the Riviera"
 "The Chocolate Egg"
 "The Unspoken Wish"
 "l’Homme"
 "Mimi Smith"
 "The Soliloquy in the Last Act"
 "The Pearl Necklace,"
 "Getting Into Death"

Sources

1974 short story collections
Short story collections by Thomas M. Disch
Rupert Hart-Davis books